Søråsen  is a mountain of Vestland, in southern Norway.

Mountains of Vestland